WAAF may refer to:

 w3af, (short for web application attack and audit framework), an open-source web application security scanner
 Women's Auxiliary Air Force, a British military service in World War II
 Waaf, a member of the service
 WAAF (AM), a radio station (910 AM) licensed to Scranton, Pennsylvania, United States
 WKVB (FM), a radio station (107.3 FM) licensed to Westborough, Massachusetts, United States, which used the WAAF call letters from 1968 to 2020
 West Austin Antenna Farm, an antenna farm located west in Austin, Texas, United States
 Wheeler Army Airfield